Futoshi Shinohara (born 14 April 1962) is a Japanese male former long-distance runner who competed in marathons. He represented his country at the 1991 World Championships in Athletics and finished in fifth place. He set a personal best of 2:11:34 hours at the 1992 Tokyo International Marathon, where he placed sixth.

On the professional circuit, he won the 1986 Perth Marathon and 1990 Hokkaido Marathon. He was also runner-up at the Toronto Marathon, Beppu-Ōita Marathon, and Otawara Marathon.

International competitions

References

External links

Living people
1962 births
Japanese male long-distance runners
Japanese male marathon runners
World Athletics Championships athletes for Japan